Alessio Lanotte (born 31 March 1992) is an Italian footballer who plays as a defender for Italian Lega Pro Prima Divisione club Andria.

Career
Born in Barletta, Province of Barletta–Andria–Trani, Apulia, Lanotte joined F.C. Internazionale Milano in 2006. He was the member of Giovanissimi Nazionali under-15 team, as a midfielder. In August 2007 he left for Spezia along with Paolo Campinoti. In the next season he left for Benevento. He was the member of Allievi Nazionali under-17 team.

In 2009 Lanotte returned to hometown club Barletta. He was the member of the first team despite young age. He was the defender of the first 3 rounds of 2010–11 Lega Pro Seconda Divisione. but after the arrival of Simone Perico, Lanotte was on the bench. After a limited first team appearance, Lanotte left for Serie D team Viterbese on free transfer in October 2010. In December, he was signed by Apulian team Trani. In 2011–12 Serie D, he played for another Apulian team Casarano. On 1 February 2012 he returned to professional football for A.S. Andria BAT.

References

External links
 Football.it Profile 
 

Italian footballers
Inter Milan players
Spezia Calcio players
Benevento Calcio players
A.S.D. Barletta 1922 players
U.S. Viterbese 1908 players
S.S. Fidelis Andria 1928 players
Association football defenders
People from Barletta
1992 births
Living people
Footballers from Apulia
Sportspeople from the Province of Barletta-Andria-Trani